At the 1936 Winter Olympics, one individual ski jumping event was contested. It was held on Sunday, 16 February 1936.

Medalists

Final standings

The competition took place at "Olympiaschanze" with a K-point of 80 metres. It started at 11 a.m. The weather conditions were good with temperatures between 0° to 3° Celsius and no wind.

The 80 metres were not reached due to difficult snow conditions, so the winner's lengths were 74.5 meters and 75 meters respectively. The second placed Sven Eriksson was able to stand 76 metres twice. In the second run Shinji Tatsuta reached 77 metres but was not able to stand his jump. Four jumpers fell Goro Adachi in the second run after a very attractive performance in the first heat. Shinji Tatsuta and Sauli Pälli fell in both runs, and Mario Bonomo was the only competitor who did not finish the contest after his fall in the first run.

The three judges, G. Schmidt (Germany), J. Asp (Norway), and R. Straumann (Switzerland), decided that Birger Ruud presented the most sophisticated style.

Participating nations
A total of 48 ski jumpers from 14 nations competed at the Garmisch-Partenkirchen Games:

References

 Following his silver medal at the 1936 Winter Olympics, Sven Eriksson assumed the name Sven Selånger after his home town because there were so many Swedes with the surname of Eriksson.

External links
International Olympic Committee results database
Official Olympic Report
 
FIS 1936 Ski Jumping results

 
1936 Winter Olympics events
1936
1936 in ski jumping
Ski jumping competitions in Germany